Vaakevandring was a Norwegian unblack metal band that was active from 1996 to 2007. The name in Norwegian is a reference to the resurrection of Jesus. Vaakevandring played symphonic black metal with influences from Norwegian folk music.

History
In 1996, Alexander Nygård and Trond Bjørnstad formed a pop band called Lothlorien with Morten Sigmund Magerøy and a local guitar player. Lothlorien's style became heavier and soon changed its name to Inertia. Trond left bass and began to do death growl vocals and the second guitar player started playing bass. 

Lothlorien had some internal problems because of religion. The second guitar player (then new bass player) wanted to write about darker subjects, and eventually left the band. Around the same time Pål and Ronny Hansen invited Magerøy to join them in their project "Signum Crusis". They rehearsed once and then Alexander Nygård became their guitarist. They changed the band name to "Korsferd". Morten played guitar, Ronny played bass and Pål Dæhlen played drums. Hansen concentrated on vocals and Trond became the bass player. By that time the band name was changed to Vaakevandring.

The band achieved notable popularity for its Demo 98/99. It was produced and engineered by Stian Aarstad, the keyboard player of Dimmu Borgir. This caused a lot of rumors on the internet. The reason Stian wanted to mix their demo, was that he heard them at a show they played. He offered them a free session in studio, because he needed training in mixing and engineering. Their demo was finished in December 1998, and they have at this point made 1000 copies of it. It was released on cassette in Indonesia through THT Productions in the beginning of 2000. 

Next, the band recorded a song entitled "Fall of Man" for Endtime Productions' compilation In the Shadow of Death. Antestor's Lars Stokstad played guitars on that song. Both Hansen and Magerøy joined the notable band Antestor around this time while still were members of Vaakevandring. Pål Dæhlen joined Frosthardr. Vaakevandring's demo was re-released as a self-titled EP by the Norwegian label Momentum Scandinavia. It has become a classic of the unblack metal genre.

They performed as co-headliners with Antestor at Sweden's Endtime Fest in 2007. Antestor's guitarist Vemod (Lars Stokstad) played guitars for that show.

Style and importance
In the early 1990s the unblack metal scene was formed and it resented the satanism contained in black metal lyrics. The founder of unblack metal was Horde. The genre initially focused on Christian elementary content as the setting of the Father's Prayer, and issues such as conversion and salvation. The bands such as Antestor, Crimson Moonlight and Vaakevandring are believed to have taken a more emotional and philosophical approach to lyrics, as opposed to an exclusive evangelism approach. Vaakevandring transferred the development of the classic black metal in Scandinavian to the emotional dealing with philosophical and ideological content to the Christian part of the scene.

2007 led to a revitalization of the project. In the wake of the Endtime Festival in Sweden, the band played as the headliner. Because of the personnel, they overlapped their program together with Antestor.

Members
Last Known Lineup
Ronny Hansen - vocals (Antestor, Grave Declaration) (1996-2007)
Morten Sigmund Magerøy - keyboards, guitar, clean vocals (ex-Antestor, Frosthardr) (1996-2007)
Alexander Nygård - guitar (1996-2007)
Pål Dæhlen - drums (ex-Antestor, Frosthardr) (1996-2006)
Trond Bjørnstad - bass (1996-2007)
Solveig Maria Magerøy - soprano

Live
Lars "Vemod" Stokstad - guitar (Antestor) (2007)
Fionnghuala - soprano (ex-Slechtvalk, ex-Antestor) (2007)

Discography

Demo 98/99 (demo) - (1999)
"Fall of Man" (song) - appeared in the compilation In the Shadow of Death - A Scandinavian Extreme Music Compilation (2000)
Vaakevandring (EP) - (2004)

References

Citations

External links
Original website in Google cache
Profile at MusicMight

Norwegian unblack metal musical groups
Musical groups established in 1996
1996 establishments in Norway
Musical groups disestablished in 2001
2001 disestablishments in Norway
Musical groups from Akershus